Georghausen Castle is a moated castle in the district of Georghausen of the municipality of Lindlar, Oberbergischer Kreis in North Rhine-Westphalia (Germany).

History
The castle Georghausen and a mill was first mentioned in a document in 1466. In 1490-1 a new drawbridge was built. In 1830 it was noted that the hamlet of Georghausen had a population of 56 inhabitants. Since 1951 the castle has served as a club house and restaurant.

References

External links 

Georghausen Castle at Oberbergischesland.de 

Castles in North Rhine-Westphalia
Buildings and structures in Oberbergischer Kreis